Daniel James or Dan James may refer to:

Dan James (American football) (1937–1987), American football player
Daniel James (boxer), boxer from Trinidad & Tobago known as Gentle Daniel
Daniel James (businessman) (1801–1876), one of the co-founders of Phelps, Dodge & Co.
Daniel James (game developer) (born 1971), British-Canadian video game developer
Daniel James (Gwyrosydd) (1848–1920), Welsh poet and hymn-writer
Daniel James (historian) (born 1948), British historian and expert in Peronism
Daniel James (record producer) (born 1975), Australian music producer and songwriter
Daniel James (singer), a stage name of Colin Heywood
Daniel James (British Army soldier) (born 1962), British Army corporal and interpreter, convicted of espionage
Daniel Willis James (1832–1907), American businessman
Daniel James Jr. (1920–1978), African American USAF general
Daniel Lewis James (1911–1988), American author
Daniel James (footballer) (born 1997), Welsh international footballer
Daniel James III (1945–2017), United States Air Force general